King Fahd Passport Island, or simply Passport Island, is an  island divided between  Bahrain and Saudi Arabia.

History
The King Fahd Causeway opened in 1986 and included the building of the artificial island. Its route was chosen as the shortest path between the island of Bahrain and mainland Saudi Arabia. It is named after King Fahd bin Abdul Aziz Al Saud, then ruler of Saudi Arabia.

Geography
The island is located on the King Fahd Causeway.
The artificial island is also named Middle Island, Embankment 4. 
The buildings of King Fahd Causeway Authority and other government Directorates were erected on the Border Station, as well as two mosques, two Coast Guard towers and two  tower restaurants. The border station also has extensive landscaping all around the islands in addition to the services and road stations.

The Border Station was designed as two islands connected by an isthmus, with the west side designated as Saudi Arabian and the east as Bahraini.

Demography
The only inhabited place is the staff building on the center of the island. The staff belong to the King Fahd Causeway Authority.

Administration
The island belongs to the Northern Governorate in Bahrain, and the Eastern Province in Saudi Arabia.

Transportation
The causeway has two segments from the island:
 From the Border Station to Al-Aziziyyah, south of Khobar.
 From the Border Station to Nasan Island in Bahrain.

Economics
The inhabitants on the island are engaged in Ministry duties for the incoming citizens to the country.

The Saudi side of the border station has outlets of McDonald's and Kudu and the Bahraini side of the border station has a McDonald's outlet.

Image gallery

References

External links 

 

Islands of Bahrain
Islands of Saudi Arabia
Divided regions
International islands
Artificial islands